The Redemptoris Mater House of Formation in London forms men to become diocesan and missionary priests for the Roman Catholic Archdiocese of Westminster to serve the New Evangelization and is part of the wider network of the Redemptoris Mater seminaries and the Neocatechumenal Way.

The Redemptoris Mater House of Formation in the Archdiocese of Westminster was established in 1991 by Cardinal Basil Hume and was officially established as a House of Formation within the structure of the Diocesan Seminary, Allen Hall Seminary on 13 December 2013 with the public signing of its statute by the Archbishop of Westminster, Vincent Nichols. The House of Formation is dependent on the Allen Hall seminary for academic and formal priestly training and upon the Neocatechumenal Way for spiritual and faith formation.

The first ordination from the House of Formation was to the deaconate (deacon) by Cardinal Basil Hume in November 1998 and later to the priesthood in July 1999 by 
Bishop Patrick O'Donoghue. As of 2021, 21 priests from the Redemptoris Mater House of Formation had been ordained for the Archdiocese of Westminster.

Fr Francesco Donega was the superior of the House of Formation from 1994 until 2017, leaving to be appointed as Vice-Rector and then Rector of Redemptoris Mater Rome. The current superior of the house is Fr Lorenzo Andrieni, a priest of the Diocese of Westminster.

References

External links
 

Catholic seminaries in England